Sthelenus is a genus of beetles in the family Cerambycidae, containing the following species:

 Sthelenus ichneumoneus Buquet, 1859
 Sthelenus morosus Pascoe, 1862

References

Necydalopsini